Stapfiella usambarica is a shrub native to the Usambara mountains of Tanzania, Africa. It can be found at altitudes of 1900 - 2230 m. As of 2012, the conservation status of S. usambarica has not been evaluated.

Flowers may be distylous, additional evidence is required.

References 

Passifloraceae
Flora of Tanzania
Plants described in 1953